A Star Is Born is the soundtrack album to the 2018 musical film of the same name, performed by its stars Lady Gaga and Bradley Cooper. It was released on October 5, 2018, by Interscope Records. Cooper teamed up with Gaga's recurring collaborator DJ White Shadow, and an assortment of country musicians, including Lukas Nelson, who also stars in the film as a member of Cooper's band. The soundtrack also includes contributions from Jason Isbell, Mark Ronson, Diane Warren, and Andrew Wyatt of Miike Snow.

The soundtrack is a pop and blues rock album containing songs about love and its struggles. Commercially, the album has topped the charts in more than 20 countries, attaining gold and platinum certifications from many of them, while selling over six million copies worldwide as of June 2019. The track "Shallow" was released as the soundtrack's lead single on September 27, 2018, while "Always Remember Us This Way" and "I'll Never Love Again" also received a limited release in selected countries.

A Star Is Born was nominated for a total of seven Grammy Awards, winning Best Pop Duo/Group Performance and Best Song Written for Visual Media for the song "Shallow", and a year later Best Compilation Soundtrack for Visual Media and another Best Song Written for Visual Media, this time for "I'll Never Love Again (Film Version)". It also won Best Film Music at the 72nd British Academy Film Awards. In just over a year, the soundtrack managed to become the 33rd biggest album of the 2010s on the US Billboard 200.

Background and development
In March 2015, Warner Bros. announced that Bradley Cooper was in talks to make his directorial debut with A Star Is Born, the fourth iteration of the 1937 film of the same name. Lady Gaga was officially attached to the film in August 2016, with the studio green-lighting the project to begin production in early 2017. Cooper plays Jackson Maine, "a veteran country singer who discovers and eventually falls in love with a struggling singer-songwriter named Ally, played by Gaga." Gaga "helped inform Cooper's performance as a musician".

Cooper spent two-and-a-half years prepping for the film and determining what kind of musician his character would be. He worked with a number of musicians and vocal coach Roger Love. Cooper said, "by the end he just kind of started developing into his own sort of creation. If I had another year of prep, it would have been complete rock, but now it's some sort of hybrid."

Writing and recording

Cooper described the soundtrack "an evolution, like the story." Gaga and Cooper were writing songs for the soundtrack during filming, leading to "so many different incarnations of each song." Cooper added that "the music really became a character in the movie. There is no lyric that's ever in any point of the movie that doesn't have exactly to do with where one of them is or hopes to be or regrets being. That was our launching pad and then it was just about discovering what songs fit in the right places." Jason Isbell wrote a song for Cooper's character, which became "the sword with which a lot of the music spawned from [Cooper]". Isbell sent the song through Dave Cobb, a Nashville-based producer with whom Cooper had been collaborating.

Cooper approached Lukas Nelson (son of country music singer Willie Nelson) after seeing him perform at Desert Trip in October 2016 and asked him to work on the film as a music consultant. Nelson said he began "writing songs for the movie, just for the heck of it, and sending them over to the producer, and they started liking them. Then Lady Gaga came by and I met her and we clicked. We became good friends, and we started writing together." Gaga, in turn, provided backing vocals on two tracks on Nelson's self-titled album released in 2017. Nelson and his band, Lukas Nelson & Promise of the Real, appear in the film as Cooper's backing band. Gaga reunited with producer Mark Ronson and songwriter Hillary Lindsey, who had both contributed to her previous studio album Joanne (2016). She worked with recurring collaborator DJ White Shadow on the soundtrack's more pop-oriented numbers performed by her character Ally. Much of the album was recorded live on set, at Gaga's insistence.

Music and lyrics
The soundtrack has been described as primarily a pop and blues rock album. It also incorporates elements of country, rock, folk rock, electropop, and dance-pop. Billboard says its lyrics are about wanting change, its struggle, love, romance, and bonding, describing the music as "timeless, emotional, gritty and earnest. They sound like songs written by artists who, quite frankly, are supremely messed up but hit to the core of the listener."

Release and promotion
The soundtrack's track list and release date were announced on August 30, 2018. Interscope Records tweeted that the album "features 19 songs in a wide range of musical styles + 15 dialogue tracks that will take you on a journey that mirrors the experience of seeing the film."

Singles
"Shallow" was released alongside a music video on September 27, 2018, as the soundtrack's lead single, and also appears in the film A Star Is Born, it is sung by Lady Gaga, and Bradley Cooper. The single was also nominated for multiple awards, and both singers went on to give a performance of the single at the 2019 Oscars. It is also one of the longest running singles in radio history, and stayed within the top ten on multiple charts, in multiple countries for several months.

Two radio-only singles followed in selected countries. "Always Remember Us This Way" and "I'll Never Love Again" were distributed across Europe as radio-only singles on January 4, 2019, and May 27, 2019, respectively. All three singles have been nominated for a minimum of one Grammy Award.

Critical reception

The soundtrack received a positive response from critics. At Metacritic, which assigns a normalized rating out of 100 to reviews from mainstream publications, the album has an average score of 78, based on 8 reviews, indicating "generally favorable reviews". In a positive review, The Washington Post called the soundtrack a "five-star marvel" and stated that it is a possible contender to win a Grammy Award. Ben Beaumont-Thomas of The Guardian gave the album a positive review, acknowledging "Bradley Cooper shows he can sing as well as act and direct", but that "it is Lady Gaga's pop prowess that lifts each track, be it spectacular piano ballads or heart-rending duets"

In a positive review, Stephen Thomas Erlewine, writing for AllMusic, said "All the songs make sense narratively and on their own, so they hold together well and would amount to a first-rate soundtrack", but criticized the dialogue included in the album. Rolling Stone Brittany Spanos gave the soundtrack four stars out of a possible five, saying "The music Gaga helps write for this stretch in Ally's career...is gorgeous--romantic without being trite and powerful." Nick Reilly of NME complimented the album's "emotionally charged songs that feel entirely appropriate for this heartfelt tale of doomed romance", adding that the album is "one of the best Hollywood soundtracks of recent years."

Writing for The Daily Telegraph, Neil McCormick gave the album a moderately positive review, saying the soundtrack was enjoyable, but criticized the "slightly awkward journey from rock balladry to slickly superficial pop" and stated that "there is also a weird disconnect as the soundtrack shifts gear to anodyne modern pop". Jeremy Winograd of Slant Magazine, in a mixed review, was critical of the album, saying "There's undoubtedly a strong 10-song album lodged at the core of A Star Is Born, but unlike the film, wherein an outsized sense of sentimentality is rendered affecting by the more grounded performances, there's not nearly enough substance here to justify all the bombast."

Commercial performance
A Star is Born original soundtrack has sold more than 1.2 million copies worldwide. It was the fourth best-selling album of 2019 globally, and ranked second among female artists, behind Taylor Swift's Lover (3.2 million). Fuelled by the success of the soundtrack, Gaga also ranked as the ninth best-selling artist of 2019 globally, and fourth female overall, behind Swift, Billie Eilish and Ariana Grande. Worldwide, the album went on to sell 3.1 million copies by the end of 2019, and a total six million equivalent units.

North America

A Star Is Born opened atop the US Billboard 200 with 231,000 album-equivalent units, including 162,000 pure album sales. It had the biggest overall sales week for a soundtrack in over three years, and is Gaga's fifth US number-one album as well as Cooper's first. Beside its pure album sales, A Star Is Born earned 37,000 in stream-equivalent units and 32,000 from track-equivalent units. The soundtrack spent a second week at number one there with 143,000 album-equivalent units (86,000 being pure sales), and became Gaga's second album to top the chart for two consecutive weeks after Born This Way (2011). It then held the country's summit for a third week in a row with 109,000 equivalent units (61,000 pure sales), becoming the first soundtrack since High School Musical 2 in 2007 to top the chart for its first three weeks. Additionally, it became Gaga's longest running chart-topping album in the country. A Star Is Born was displaced one week later by Andrea Bocelli's Sì. The Recording Industry Association of America (RIAA) certified it double platinum for selling over two million album-equivalent units and by March 2019, pure sales also crossed over a million copies. Following the 91st Academy Awards, the soundtrack returned to the top of Billboard 200 for a fourth non-consecutive week with 128,000 album-equivalent units (76,000 pure sales) on the chart dated March 9, becoming Gaga's longest running number-one album in the country and the first soundtrack to do so since Frozen (2013). The soundtrack went on to remain on the chart for 103 weeks. As of August 2019, the soundtracks has sold 1,148,000 copies within the United States, while it has earned 2.7 million equivalent album units in the country, according to Billboards report in September 2020.

The soundtrack entered at number one on the Canadian Albums Chart, selling 18,000 equivalent units, earning the top sales and digital song download honors and the seventh highest on-demand streams for the week. It was Gaga's third album to reach the summit in the nation and her first since Born This Way. A Star Is Born held the top position for the next week, with another 12,000 equivalent units and was also the top-selling album. It had an 11% increase in sales during the third week and remained atop the charts, selling close to 14,000 equivalent units. Like in the United States, the soundtrack became Gaga's longest running chart-topping album in Canada. By the year-end, the soundtrack had sold 92,000 copies (155,000 equivalent units) in the country according to Nielsen SoundScan, and was certified Platinum by Music Canada. The Academy Awards boosted the soundtrack up to its tenth week at the top of the charts, selling another 12,000 units.

Europe
A Star Is Born faced competition in the United Kingdom from Twenty One Pilots' fifth studio album, Trench, with the midweek chart suggesting the latter to emerge as the top album. A Star Is Born pulled ahead at the last moment according to Alan Jones from Music Week, and debuted atop the UK Albums Chart with 31,816 units (including 6,178 from stream-equivalent units). It became Gaga's fourth album to reach number one in the nation and first since Artpop (2013), as well as Cooper's first entry on the chart. The soundtrack fell to number two the following week behind Jess Glynne's Always In Between, selling 24,732 equivalent units. For the week ending November 1, 2018, the soundtrack moved back atop the chart with 24,982 copies sold (including 6,645 from sales-equivalent streams). "Shallow" also reached the top of the UK Singles Chart that week, making Gaga and Cooper score an Official UK Chart double, this being Gaga's third time to do so. The soundtrack received a 2× Platinum certification from the British Phonographic Industry (BPI) for selling over 600,000 units in the country.

A Star Is Born opened at number one in both Ireland and Scotland, and was Gaga's third number one in the former. During its eleventh week atop the Irish chart, the soundtrack attained its highest sales tally, helped by the release of the Special Deluxe Edition. In France, the soundtrack sold 8,700 copies and debuted at number seven on the SNEP Albums Chart, and reached the top of the charts after 20 weeks with sales of 9,700 copies. It was the 22nd best-selling album of the year in France in 2018. The Syndicat National de l'Édition Phonographique (SNEP) certified the record Diamond for 500,000 equivalent units and it had sold a total of 200,000 pure copies by May 2019.

Oceania
In Australia, A Star Is Born entered at number three on the ARIA Albums Chart, giving Gaga her seventh top 10 album in the country and her sixth to reach the top three. Two weeks later, the soundtrack reached the top of the charts, becoming Gaga's third album to reach the Australian charts summit after The Fame Monster and Born This Way. The soundtrack debuted at number six in the New Zealand Albums Chart, and after two weeks reached the top. A Star Is Born became the year's longest running number-one album in Australia at 11 weeks (ranking at number three on the year-end charts) and was certified triple platinum by the Australian Recording Industry Association (ARIA) for selling over 210,000 units. In New Zealand it topped the charts for 16 weeks, breaking the record for most consecutive weeks at the top, previously held by ÷, Ed Sheeran's third studio album, and was certified triple platinum for selling 45,000 units by the Recorded Music NZ (RMNZ).

Accolades

A Star Is Born was nominated for a total of seven Grammy Awards, including a winning for Best Compilation Soundtrack for Visual Media and two Song of the Year nominations, winning the Best Pop Duo/Group Performance with "Shallow" and Best Song Written for Visual Media with both "Shallow" and "I'll Never Love Again". It also won the British Academy Film Awards for Best Film Music and was nominated in the category of Best Soundtrack Album at the 9th Hollywood Music in Media Awards. Julianne Jordan and Julia Michels won in the categories for Outstanding Music Supervision at the same awards.

Uproxx website ranked the soundtrack at number four on their list of 20 Must-Hear Pop Albums From 2018, with Chloe Gilke from the publication adding that "A Star Is Born could have gotten away with a lesser soundtrack, but it's all the more impressive for featuring some of the best pop music of 2018." Katie Atkinson from Billboard picked A Star Is Born as the 21st best release on their ranking of the 50 Best Albums of 2018, saying that "like the best soundtracks, this one truly resonates because it re-transports you to the world of [the film], thanks to a combination of live and studio recordings that include ambient noise and audience feedback and put you right back onstage with Jackson and Ally." James Rettig from Stereogum listed it as one of the Noteworthy Movie Soundtracks From 2018, adding that "As far as massive music blockbusters go, you can't do much better than A Star Is Born, which is sad and entertaining and romantic and ends up being pretty good at all of it."

Track listing

Notes
  – additional vocal production
  – additional production
  – main and additional production
  – vocal production

Personnel

Production

 Dae Bennett – engineer
 Paul Blair – composer, producer
 Bobby Campbell – executive producer, producer
 Dave Cobb – producer
 Tom Elmhirst – dialogue mixing, mixing
 Lisa Einhorn-Gilder – production coordination
 Bradley Cooper – composer, primary artist, producer
 Bill Gerber – executive producer
 Ashley Gutierrez – executive assistant
 Natalie Hemby – composer
 Darren Higman – executive producer
 Jason Isbell – composer
 Gena Johnson – engineer
 Julianne Jordan – music supervisor
 Paul Kennerley – composer
 Lady Gaga – additional production, composer, horn arrangements, piano, producer, string arrangements, vocal producer
 Brian Lambert – executive in charge of music
 Hillary Lindsey – composer
 Louiguy – composer
 Lori McKenna – composer
 Randy Merrill – mastering
 Joe Nino-Hernes – lacquer cutting
 Kari Miazek – coordination
 Nick Monson – additional production, composer, guitar, keyboards, piano, producer, programming, string arrangements, vocals (background)
 Amanda Narkis – executive in charge of music
 Lukas Nelson – composer, guitar, guitar (acoustic), guitar (electric), producer
 Brian Newman – producer, trumpet
 Mark Nilan Jr. – additional production, composer, horn arrangements, keyboards, piano, producer, programming, string arrangements
 Julia Michaels – composer
 Julia Michels – music supervisor
 Jon Peters – executive producer
 Édith Piaf – composer
 Aaron Raitiere – composer
 Benjamin Rice – engineer, producer, vocal producer, vocals (background)
 Mark Ronson – composer
 Anthony Rossomando – composer
 Anthony Seyler – executive producer
 Ivy Skoff – coordination, string coordinator
 Eddie Spear – engineer
 JoAnn Tominaga – coordination, string contractor
 Justin Tranter – composer
 Diane Warren – composer
 Andrew Wyatt – composer

Management

 Alec Baldwin – featured artist
 Rob Bisel – assistant
 Bo Bodnar – assistant
 Brandon Bost – assistant
 Paul Broucek – executive in charge of music
 D.J. Shangela Pierce – featured artist
 Sam Elliott – featured artist
 Donald King – featured artist
 Michael Mancini – featured artist
 Anthony Ramos – featured artist
 John Rooney – assistant
 Gena Rositano – featured artist
 Tyler Shields – assistant
 Alex Williams – assistant
 Matt Wolach – assistant

Music

 Brian Allen – bass
 Charlie Bisharat – violin
 Alberto Bof – keyboards
 Jacob Braun – celli
 Brockett Parsons – keyboards
 Jon Drummond – bass
 Andrew Duckles – viola
 Alma Fernandez – viola
 Daniel Foose – bass
 Paul Francis – drums
 Grant Garibyan – violin
 Gary Grant – trumpet
 Lila Hood – violin
 Benjamin Jacobson – violin
 Chris Johnson – drums
 Steve Kortyka – saxophone
 Marisa Kuney – violin
 Songa Lee – violin
 Melvin "Maestro" Lightford – keyboards
 Shigeru Logan – viola
 Anthony LoGerfo – drums
 David Low – celli
 Andy Martin – trombone
 Corey McCormick – bass
 Serena McKinney – violin
 Tato Melgar – percussion
 Pablo Mendez – violin
 Leah Metzler – celli
 Joel Peskin – sax (baritone)
 Chris Powell – drums
 Leroy Powell – pedal steel guitar
 Kate Reddish – viola
 Tom Scott – contractor, sax (tenor)
 Jesse Siebenberg – lap steel guitar
 Alex Smith – piano
 Tim Stewart – guitar
 Ricky Tillo – guitar
 Adrienne Woods – celli

Artwork

 Peter Lindbergh – photography
 Clay Enos – photography

Personnel adapted from A Star Is Born soundtrack liner notes and AllMusic.

Charts

Weekly charts

Year-end charts

Decade-end charts

Certifications and sales

Release history

See also

 List of artists who have achieved simultaneous UK and US number-one hits
 List of Billboard 200 number-one albums of 2018
 List of number-one albums of 2018 (Australia)
 List of number-one albums of 2019 (Belgium)
 List of number-one albums of 2018 (Canada)
 List of number-one albums of 2019 (Canada)
 List of number-one albums from the 2010s (Denmark)
 List of number-one albums of 2018 (Ireland)
 List of number-one albums from the 2010s (New Zealand)
 List of number-one hits of 2019 (France)
 List of number-one albums in Norway
 List of number-one albums of 2019 (Poland)
 List of number-one albums of 2019 (Portugal)
 List of number-one albums of 2018 (Scotland)
 List of number-one hits of 2018 (Switzerland)
 List of UK Albums Chart number ones of the 2010s
 List of UK Album Downloads Chart number ones of the 2010s

References

External links
 

2010s film soundtrack albums
2018 soundtrack albums
Albums produced by Dave Cobb
Albums produced by Lady Gaga
Albums produced by Mark Ronson
Albums produced by Nick Monson
Albums recorded at Electric Lady Studios
Albums recorded at Shangri-La (recording studio)
Grammy Award for Best Compilation Soundtrack for Visual Media
Interscope Records albums
Lady Gaga albums